Eulophia alta is a species of orchid, known as the wild coco. It is widespread across tropical and subtropical parts of Africa, South America, Central America, Mexico and the West Indies, as well as the southeastern United States (states of Georgia and Florida).

References

alta
Orchids of Central America
Orchids of Belize
Flora of Georgia (U.S. state)
Orchids of Florida
Orchids of Africa
Orchids of South America
Orchids of North America
Plants described in 1767
Terrestrial orchids
Flora of Peru
Flora without expected TNC conservation status